Myroslav Kostyantynovych Znovenko (born 26 February 2002) is a Ukrainian professional footballer who plays as a goalkeeper for Metalist Kharkiv on loan from Dnipro-1.

Career
Born in Luhansk, Znovenko is a product of the local Zorya Luhansk and also Metalist Kharkiv and Dnipro academies and in August 2019 he signed a contract with Ukrainian side Dnipro-1 and played for its in the Ukrainian Premier League Reserves and Under 19 Championship. 

Starting from 2021, he played on loan first as a main choice goalkeeper of Nikopol in the Ukrainian Second League, and later in Metalist Kharkiv in the Ukrainian Premier League.

References

External links
 
 

2002 births
Living people
Footballers from Luhansk
Ukrainian footballers
Ukraine youth international footballers
Ukraine under-21 international footballers
Association football goalkeepers
FC Dnipro players
SC Dnipro-1 players
FC Nikopol players
FC Metalist Kharkiv players
Ukrainian Second League players
Ukrainian Amateur Football Championship players